MTV1987 is the debut studio album by American recording artist Kevin Abstract, released on July 15, 2014. As of November 2018, it has been removed from most major download and streaming services.

Background 
Kevin Abstract began writing and recording his debut album MTV1987 near the end of 2013, soon after the release of his first self-titled EP. It was recorded in just under 6 months of constant studio sessions with his in-house record producer, Romil. MTV1987 is a conceptual album that fuses elements of past and present pop culture with the setting of the predominantly digital age we currently live in today. The album itself describes Kevin's life. The overall sound of the album was inspired by artists such as: Kid Cudi, Frank Ocean, Justin Timberlake, Crystal Castles and Britney Spears.

Reception 
Upon release, MTV1987 was met with critical acclaim and was praised for its experimental nature as well as the overall catchy pop tone it manages to consistently maintain. The album was posted on popular music sites such as Billboard, Complex, Spin, 2DopeBoyz, and Pigeons & Planes. The album ranked at #38 on Spin's "Top 40 Hip-hop Albums of 2014" list as well as #31 on Pigeons & Planes' list of "Top 50 Best Albums of 2014"

Track listing 

Notes
  signifies an additional writer / producer.
 "Dad" features additional vocals by Ian's Dad.
 "Save" features additional vocals by Lontalius.
 "27" features additional vocals by Jack Larsen.
 "Drugs" and "Tame Cab" feature additional vocals by Russell Boring.
 "Mom" features additional vocals by Ian's Mom.
 "Snakes" features additional vocals by Frank X.
 "Drug Dealer" features additional vocals by Drug Dealer.

Sample credits
 "Dad" and "Mom" contain samples of "Sandy", performed by Whirr.
 "Save" contains a sample of "The Krockadile", performed by King Krule.
 "Hell" contains a sample of "Untrust Us", performed by Crystal Castles.
 "Tame Cab" contains a sample of "When the Levee Breaks", performed by Led Zeppelin.
 "Camp Green Lake" contains a sample of "Keep Digging", performed by Kermoadi.

Personnel 

 Russell Boring – mixing, mastering, additional vocals (tracks 5, 7), additional production (track 7, 10)
 Matt Champion – featured artist (track 9), writer (track 9)
 Drug Dealer – additional vocals (track 12)
 Frames Janco – production (track 11), guitar (track 7)
 Frank X – additional vocals (track 9)
 Neil Hemnani – additional production (track 10)
 HK Covers – creative direction, graphic design
 Ian's Dad – additional vocals (track 1)
 Ian's Mom – additional vocals (track 6)
 Kiko Merley – additional production (track 3)
 Jack Larsen – additional vocals (track 4), additional writing (track 4)
 Lontalius – additional vocals (track 2)
 Robert Ontenient – additional production (track 3)
 Shaamir – additional writing (track 7)
 Rex – co-production (track 7)
 Romil Hemnani – executive production, creative direction, production (tracks 1-12)
 Ian "Kevin Abstract" Simpson – executive production, creative direction, lead artist, writer (tracks 1-12)
 Quiet Luke – guitar (track 3)
 Ameer Vann – additional writing (track 7)
 Sage Williams – featured artist (track 10)
 William Wood – additional writing (track 8)

References 

2014 debut albums
Concept albums
Kevin Abstract albums